Please Experience Wolfmother Live is the debut video album by Australian hard rock band Wolfmother. Directed by The Malloys, who also directed a number of the band's music videos, the album features footage from three performances on Wolfmother's 2006 world tour in promotion of their 2005 self-titled debut album. It was first released in Australia on 31 August 2007 by Modular Recordings, and later followed in Europe on 10 September and finally in North America on 20 November.

The main feature of Please Experience Wolfmother Live is the band's full 12-song performance at the Hordern Pavilion in Sydney on 20 July 2006, which is introduced by Jackass stars Johnny Knoxville and Bam Margera. In addition to this, the album features "Joker & the Thief" at the ARIA Music Awards on 29 October 2006, "Dimension" and "Love Train" from a show at Brixton Academy in London, England on 15 November 2006, all five of the band's music videos at the time of release, and a short documentary.

One week prior to the video album, an extended play (EP) version of Please Experience Wolfmother Live was released, featuring three tracks and one video from the Hordern Pavilion show. The video was certified platinum by the Australian Recording Industry Association.

Critical reception
Media response to Please Experience Wolfmother Live was mixed. Writing for The Sunday Times online publication PerthNow, Polly Coufos awarded the album three and a half stars out of five, proposing that "[Wolfmother's] brutal sound invokes the gods of metal past, with just enough tongue-in-cheek humour to keep outsiders interested too", praising "Joker & the Thief" as the highlight. A reviewer for the Manchester Evening News was more negative, however, claiming that "the performance [Wolfmother] have chosen to immortalise on [Please Experience Wolfmother Live] is not exactly their finest", criticising the "competent but bog-standard" camera work and editing, "uninteresting" stage set, and charisma-lacking performance.

Track listing
All songs written and composed by Andrew Stockdale, Chris Ross and Myles Heskett.

Video album

Extended play

Personnel

Wolfmother
Andrew Stockdale – vocals, guitar
Chris Ross – bass, organ
Myles Heskett – drums
Additional musicians
Gustav Ejstes – flute ("Witchcraft")

Production personnel
The Malloys – direction
Rene Shalala – production
John Watson – production
Steve Pav – production
Karen Tinman – production
Archie Gormley – production

Additional personnel
Jonathan Zawada – design
Daniel Boud – photography
Martin Philbey – photography
John Stanton – photography
Gary Wolstenholme – photography

Charts

Certifications

References

Live video albums
2007 video albums
2007 live albums
Wolfmother albums